Following are lists of members of the Western Australian Legislative Council:

Prior to responsible government:

1832–1870
1870–1872
1872–1874
1874–1880
1880–1884
1884–1889
1889–1890
1890–1894

After responsible government:

Under proportional representation:

1989–1993
1993–1997
1997–2001
2001–2005
2005–2009
2009–2013
2013–2017
2017–2021
2021–2025